Tatiana Guimaraes Weston-Webb dos Santos (born May 9, 1996) is a Brazilian–American surfer based in Kauai, Hawaii.  She was the only rookie on the WCT (professional surfing) (World Championship Tour) in 2015. Weston-Webb wears jersey number 9, and  her 2016 'CT rank is number 4.  She was a competitor in the 2020 Summer Olympics, competing for Brazil.

Personal life
Weston-Webb's father, Douglas Weston-Webb, was born in England, a descendant of a family engaged in the textile business. The Weston-Webb name is a heritable double-barrelled surname, created through the marriage of two children of significant families in that industry. He was moved at an early age to the U.S. state of Florida, where he was raised. He learned to surf at age eight and later became a "surf bum" and relocated to Kauai in his 20s.

Weston-Webb's mother, Tanira Weston-Webb, was a Brazilian professional body boarder, under sponsorship by two industry companies. Tanira's sister, Andrea Guimaraes, was also a bodyboarder.

Douglas and Tanira met while she was in Hawaii. They moved to Brazil, where Tatiana was born in 1996, in Porto Alegre. Because of her father's birth in the United Kingdom, Tatiana also automatically acquired British citizenship by descent at birth. However, she has not applied for a British passport, and her father has not renewed his in many years.

Within two months of her birth in Brazil, Weston-Webb and her parents moved to Hawaii. At age 8, while watching her older brother Troy surf, Tatiana decided to take up the sport as well. Surfing became a competition between the children, and Tatiana received her first surfboard soon afterward.

In 2020, she married longtime boyfriend Jesse Mendes dos Santos, a Brazilian fellow professional surfer from Guarujá, São Paulo, who competes under the name Jesse Mendes, in an intimate beachfront ceremony held at the Princeville Resort, a Kauai hotel her father had worked at for many years after the security guard allowed them to use the otherwise expensive site at no cost during the property's renovation.

Competition background 
In 2015 Weston-Webb secured a spot in the World Championship Tour.

On April 29, 2018, she announced her switch to Brazil representation for the remainder of the 2018 WSL Championship Tour season, aiming to compete representing her native country in the 2020 Olympic Games in Tokyo, one of her dreams since surfing was announced as an official Olympic sport.

Victories

Media coverage
 2016 Surfer Magazine Hot 100 #1 Women
 2015 Free Surf Magazine Cover
 2015 Surfing Magazine Body Glove ad
 2014 Surfing Magazine online
 2014 Featured on ASP website
 2014 Surfline editorial
 2014 Surfing magazine April issue

Competitive highlights
 2016 4th place WSL Championship Tour Final Ratings
 2016 3rd place WSL/ CT Roxy Pro France
 2016 1st place Vans US Open of Surfing
 2016 3rd place WSL/ CT Drug Aware Margaret River Pro
 2016 3rd place WSL/ CT Rip Curl Women’s Pro Bells Beach
 2015 WSL/ Championship Tour Rookie of the Year
 2015 7th place WSL Championship Tour Final Ratings
 2015 5th place WSL/ CT Target Maui Pro HI
 2015 2nd place WSL/ CT Roxy Pro France
 2015 3rd place WSL/ CT Cascais Women’s Pro
 2015 1st in the overall rating for the WSL Qualifying Series
 2015 5th place WSL/ CT Women’s Drug Aware Margaret River Pro
 2015 5th place WSL/ CT Fiji Women’s Pro
 2015 1st place WSL/ QS Paul Mitchell Super Girl Pro
 2015 3rd place WSL/ CT Snapper Pro
 2015 3rd place WSL/ QS Hurley Australian Open
 2015 3rd place WSL/ QS Samsung Galaxy Hainan Pro
 2014 Qualified to the WSL Championship Tour
 2014 3rd place ASP/ QS Swatch Girls Pro
 2014 GoPro winner at the CT Fiji event
 2014 3rd place ASP/ QS Port Taranaki Pro
 2014 2nd place ASP/ QS Super Girl Pro
 2014 1st place ISA World Junior Champs
 2013 1st place ISA World Junior Champs
 2013 1st place Surfing America Championships
 2013 3rd place ASP US Open Pro Juniors
 2013 3rd place ASP/ QS Pantin Classic
 2013 2nd place ASP World Junior Champs
 12th overall on the ASP Women’s World ranking (*one spot from qualification to the ASP WCT)

References

External links
Tatiana Weston-Webb professional facebook
Surfer Magazine

Living people
1996 births
American surfers
Brazilian surfers
Olympic surfers of Brazil
Surfers at the 2020 Summer Olympics
Brazilian people of English descent
Brazilian emigrants to the United States
American people of Brazilian descent
American people of English descent
Sportspeople from Porto Alegre
American female surfers